Gary Walker may refer to:
Gary Walker (defensive end) (born 1973), former American football defensive end
Gary Walker (defensive back) (born 1991), American football free safety
Gary Walker (musician) (born 1942), drummer and vocalist

See also
Garry Walker (born 1974), Scottish conductor